Panford Beck is a minor watercourse that is entirely in the county of Norfolk, eastern England. This small short beck rises within the Parish of North Elmham a mile north east of the village of Brisley. The beck is a tributary of the Black Water which eventually joins the River Wensum.  The headwater is a small pool by the side of a lane. From here the beck flows south across open farmland where various streams and ditches contribute to its flow. After a distance of  it joins the Black Water.

References

Gallery

Rivers of Norfolk